Highway 54 is a provincial highway in the Canadian province of Saskatchewan.

References

054